The Aluminium Plant Podgorica (abbr. KAP), also known latterly as Uniprom KAP, is a Montenegrin aluminium smelter company located in Podgorica, Montenegro. The Uniprom KAP operating countries of Germany, Poland and the Czech Republic.

Synopsis
The KAP produces its own alumina, extracting it via the Bayer process out of the bauxite shipped from the Nikšić bauxite mine. The factory also has its own production of pre-baked anodes. The smelter has an installed capacity of 120,000 tons of liquid aluminum per year.

KAP is connected by railway with bauxite mines near Nikšić and the Port of Bar, and the Podgorica Airport is only a few kilometers away.

History
Construction of an aluminium smelter in Montenegro was first proposed in the 1960s, when significant quantities of high quality bauxite ore were discovered near Nikšić. With support from Pechiney construction of KAP began in 1969, while production of aluminium began in 1971.

Breakup of Yugoslavia (1990s)
The plant had its most difficult times during UN-imposed economic sanctions on FR Yugoslavia. During the sanctions, the production was reduced to 13% of capacity. In the period 1997–1999 KAP participated with 8.2–6.7% in GDP of Montenegro, and 65–67% in export for the same period. Most of the time, the KAP acquired necessary raw materials and spare parts from Glencore. The entire export was also conducted by Glencore. The company was one of the few Montenegrin companies to recover quickly after the breakup of Yugoslavia.

Russian ownership (2005–2013)
On 1 December 2005, KAP was privatized, with 65.4394% of shares being sold to Salomon Enterprises Limited (later renamed CEAC – Central European Aluminum Company), a company based in Cyprus, for €48.5 million and obligations to invest over €50 million in its modernization and environmental upgrade. CEAC is fully owned by En+ Group. The negotiations on the sale were conducted directly between Oleg Deripaska and the then Prime Minister of Montenegro, Milo Đukanović.

In May 2006 CEAC said that "various breaches of representations and warranties" of the deal were discovered by accountants Deloitte, including KAP having "hidden" debts and obligations towards the state totalling tens of millions of euros. In addition, the government-certified 2004 accounts were deemed inaccurate when it came to working capital and other assets. "It became evident to CEAC that KAP's initial financial situation had been misrepresented," the company claimed.

, the KAP has struggled to survive the impact of ongoing economic crisis. The low trading price of aluminium, and expensive production inputs, primarily the electricity and alumina production, have resulted in KAP generating daily losses of up to €200,000. The company has been unable to survive ever since without the constant Government subsidies, primarily in writing off the debt for electricity.

In June 2009, the financial situation at the company had not improved, leaving KAP in danger of being closed by CEAC. The government, not wanting to see its largest company being shut down, agreed to guarantee a €45 million loan. In exchange, the government would receive half of the stakes owned by CEAC, leaving CEAC with a stake of 29.3%.

As relationship between the owners and management and the Government of Montenegro became increasingly sour, there was an ongoing debate within the country about the fate of the company. The size of the company, number of employees, and its impact on the Montenegrin trade balance imply that efforts will be made by the Government to keep the company alive, although sustainable ownership and management arrangements are yet to be made given the current dissatisfaction with Russian owners. On 8 July 2013, KAP officially went bankrupt, having up to that point accumulated a debt of 383 million euros, while the company itself is worth 180 million euros.

Montenegrin ownership (2014–present)
In July 2014, KAP was sold for 28 million euros to the Montenegrin company Uniprom that is 100% owned by Veselin Pejović.

Controversies
Podgorica Aluminium Plant is the subject to some controversy and criticism. Although it is the biggest single contributor to Montenegrin GDP and export, it is heavily criticized for polluting the fertile Zeta plain. KAP's red mud pond is notorious for its dry red dust, that is spread by the winds across the villages in Zeta. 

KAP is also criticized for consuming most of the electrical power of Montenegro at low prices, while Montenegrin citizens face frequent shortages of electricity and pay for it at much higher prices.

Various political entities, most notably Movement for Changes, had pointed out that selling the KAP was a bad deal for the state of Montenegro. Arguments are that KAP was underpriced, and that CEAC owners have suspicious business practices, such as reporting constant annual losses, in order not to pay off dividends to the minority shareholders.

KAP's trade union has launched strikes frequently since privatization, demanding increases in wages. Strikes unfold in a tense atmosphere, as the KAP management hired a private security company whose armed personnel supervises the strikes.

References

External links
 
 Uniprom KAP at montenegroberza.com

Metal companies of Montenegro
Manufacturing companies established in 1969
1969 establishments in Montenegro
Aluminium smelters
Smelters of Yugoslavia
Smelters of Montenegro
Metal companies of Germany
1969 establishments in Germany
Metal companies of Poland
1969 establishments in Poland
Metal companies of the Czech Republic
1969 establishments in Czechoslovakia